"Memory" is a show tune composed by Andrew Lloyd Webber, with lyrics by Trevor Nunn based on poems by T. S. Eliot. It was written for the 1981 musical Cats, where it is sung primarily by the character Grizabella as a melancholic remembrance of her glamorous past and as a plea for acceptance. "Memory" is the climax of the musical and by far its best-known song, having achieved mainstream success outside of the musical. According to musicologist Jessica Sternfeld, writing in 2006, it is "by some estimations the most successful song ever from a musical."

Elaine Paige originated the role of Grizabella in the West End production of Cats and was thus the first to perform the song publicly on stage. "Memory" was named the Best Song Musically and Lyrically at the 1982 Ivor Novello Awards. In 2020, Jessie Thompson of the Evening Standard wrote, "Paige’s version set the standard and enabled Memory to become one of the most recognisable musical theatre songs of all time."

Context
In Cats, "Memory" is sung primarily by Grizabella, a one-time "glamour cat" who has fallen on hard times and is now only a shell of her former self. For most of the musical, Grizabella is ostracized by her fellow Jellicle cats. She sings a prelude version of "Memory" at the end of the first act, recalling the time before she became an outcast.

Melodic fragments of "Memory" are then sung twice in a higher D major key by Jemima (also known as Sillabub), a young cat who is sympathetic to Grizabella's plight. The first instance occurs at the beginning of the second act after "The Moments of Happiness", and the second instance occurs near the end of the second act right before Grizabella's final appearance. As Grizabella returns near the end of the musical, she sings the full version of the song as she pleads for acceptance, with Jemima joining in briefly to urge her on.

Conception and composition
Andrew Lloyd Webber originally composed the tune for a proposed Giacomo Puccini project that he later abandoned. Although the tune was intentionally written in the style of Puccini, Lloyd Webber was concerned that he had unknowingly lifted it from one of Puccini's works. He asked his father, a noted expert on Puccini, for his opinion on whether it sounded like one of the composer's works; according to Lloyd Webber, his father responded: "It sounds like a million dollars!" Prior to its inclusion in Cats, the composition had also been earmarked for his early draft of Sunset Boulevard.

The widow of Larry Clinton claimed that "Memory" was based on Clinton's "Bolero in Blue", which in turn was based on Maurice Ravel's Boléro. Musicologist John Snelson dismissed this claim, however, noting the difference in the phrasing between Boléro and "Memory": the former is long and continuous, while the latter is centered on a repeated tone and a "turnlike figure" to emphasize said tone. Snelson further argues that the chord progression (I-vi-IV-iii) and time signature in "Memory" are more akin to popular music of the time, suggesting a completely different origin than Boléro.

Cats is based on a 1939 book of poems by T. S. Eliot, Old Possum's Book of Practical Cats, and the lyrics for "Memory" were adapted from Eliot's poems "Rhapsody on a Windy Night" and "Preludes" by the musical's director Trevor Nunn. Lloyd Webber's former writing partners Don Black and Tim Rice had also each submitted a lyric to the show's producers for consideration, although Nunn's version was favoured. Elaine Paige was given a different lyric to sing to the tune of "Memory" every night during previews for Cats.

There are three key changes in "Memory" so as to keep the song within the comfortable range for a chest voice. It starts off in the key of B-flat major, switches to G-flat major as Grizabella collapses, then changes again to D-flat major for the climax. Lloyd Webber and Nunn wrote two versions of the song: one for the stage production and another for a single that Elaine Paige recorded. In the stage version, a section of the song is sung an octave higher by the kitten Jemima; the reasoning was that the low pitch (as sung by Grizabella in the single) would be difficult to hear in the live theatre setting and moreover, this duet would allow for a visual contrast between the innocent young kitten and the fallen Grizabella in the stage show. The stage version also features different lyrics as it was felt that a kitten would not sing about the same hard times as Grizabella.

The first commercial release of "Memory" was an instrumental single performed by guitarist Gary Moore. It was released in early 1981 by MCA Records to promote Cats while the musical was still in development. Paige heard this version driving home one evening and rushed into the house to record it from the radio, vowing to contact Lloyd Webber to insist on recording a vocal version of it. Before she was able to do so, the following morning he rang her to ask whether she would, at short notice, replace the injured Judi Dench as Grizabella in the London production of Cats. Paige later recalled that the opportunity to sing "Memory" was the principal reason for agreeing.

In the 2019 film adaptation featuring Jennifer Hudson as Grizabella, Jemima's soprano part was given to Victoria the White Cat.

Elaine Paige version
Elaine Paige, who originated the role of Grizabella in the West End production of Cats, released a version of the song that was a Top 10 hit in the UK, peaking at No. 6 on the UK Singles Chart in July 1981. The single recording was incorporated into the original London cast recording of the musical.

She re-recorded the song in 1998 for the video release of the musical. This version, featuring the theatre lyrics, reached #36 in the UK Singles Chart in October of that year. Paige also recorded a version for her 1983 album Stages, produced by Tony Visconti. Live performances of "Memory", which is considered her signature song, are featured on her albums Performance, Live: Celebrating A Life On Stage, and I'm Still Here: Live at the Royal Albert Hall. She also performed the song for Andrew Lloyd Webber's 50th birthday concert, released on DVD as Andrew Lloyd Webber: Celebration, for the first Chinese concerts of his work, released on DVD as Andrew Lloyd Webber: Masterpiece. Paige sang it for the recording of This is Your Life (1994) focused on the composer, and the BBC's concert for his 60th birthday in Hyde Park, London, which was filmed but, as of 2020, has never been broadcast.

Cover versions
"Memory" has been covered by numerous musical acts. By 2006, there were around 600 recorded versions of the song, ranging from easy listening to techno covers.

 Barry Manilow released a cover of "Memory" as a single in late 1982; it became the highest-charting version to date on the Billboard Hot 100 when it reached No. 39 in January 1983. Manilow's recording also made the Top 10 on the Billboard adult contemporary chart, reaching No. 8. This version is included on his album Here Comes the Night.
 Epica, the Dutch symphonic metal band, covered "Memory" for their 2004 video album We Will Take You With Us.
 Betty Buckley recorded it for the 1982 Original Broadway Cast Recording.
 Marti Webb, who played Grizabella in London and on the first UK tour, recorded it for her 1989 album Performance. A live performance was included on the 1992 album The Magic of the Musical.
 In 2008, Jason Castro on the seventh season of American Idol.
 In 2014, Nicole Scherzinger performed the song in the West End revival of Cats, and was nominated for an Olivier Award for her performance. Leona Lewis excelled with the song in 2016 on Broadway when Scherzinger could not perform.
 In 2019, Jennifer Hudson played Grizabella in the movie adaptation of the original musical Cats, performing the song at the climax of the film, just like the original musical.

Barbra Streisand version

American singer, songwriter, actress and director Barbra Streisand recorded "Memory" (produced by Lloyd Webber himself) for her 1981 album Memories. When released as a single, Streisand's cover reached No. 52 on the Billboard Hot 100 chart and No. 9 on the Billboard adult contemporary chart in 1982. In the UK this version peaked at No. 34 the same year. In Europe, it peaked at number one in Finland.

Charts

References

Print sources

External links
 Rhapsody on a Windy Night and Preludes the T. S. Eliot poems that inspired the lyrics to "Memory"

Songs about nostalgia
1981 songs
1983 singles
1980s ballads
Songs from musicals
Songs with music by Andrew Lloyd Webber
Songs based on poems
Elaine Paige songs
Barbra Streisand songs
Barry Manilow songs
Cats (musical)
Pop ballads
Number-one singles in Finland
Number-one singles in France
Columbia Records singles